Kaukuanjärvi is a medium-sized lake in the Iijoki main catchment area. It is located in Posio municipality, in the Lapland region in Finland.

See also
List of lakes in Finland

References

Lakes of Posio